With each Super Powers Collection action figure of the first two series, a minicomic was included. Below is a list of them.

Series 1

 Superman minicomic: Luthor attacks a nuclear facility and Superman must stop him. Toy-made characters: Lex Luthor (Pre-Crisis), Superman
 Batman minicomic: The Joker transforms a lot of people into Jokers. Toy-made characters: Batman, Robin, The Joker, Wonder Woman
 Wonder Woman minicomic: Brainiac seizes control of Superman's mind and sends him on a destructive rampage. In Washington D.C. Wonder Woman confronts Superman and uses her magic lasso to defeat the Man of Steel rendering him unconscious. The Amazon Princess comes under laser fire from Brainiac's spaceship but manages to escape. Wonder Woman then turns the tables on Brainiac by capturing him in her magic lasso and orders the evil computer to free Superman from his control. Toy-made characters: Wonder Woman, Superman, Brainiac (Pre-Crisis)
 The Flash minicomic: The Flash must save the Justice League from the clutches of Brainiac. Toy-made characters: Brainiac (Pre-Crisis), Superman, Hawkman, Wonder Woman, Batman, The Flash
 Brainiac minicomic: Superman and Batman must stop the chaos Brainiac is creating. Toy-made characters: Batman, Superman, Brainiac (Pre-Crisis)
 The Penguin minicomic: The Penguin steals some jewels from rich people, but two of those rich people are Bruce Wayne and Carter Hall. Toy-made characters: Batman, Hawkman, The Penguin
 The Joker minicomic: The Joker robs a bank and his Jokermobile is pursued by Batman's Batmobile. Toy-made characters: The Joker, Batman, Aquaman
 Aquaman minicomic: Aquaman and the Flash team up to stop the Penguin. Toy-made characters: The Penguin, The Flash, Aquaman
 Robin minicomic: Robin intercepts the Penguin stealing an experimental space vehicle, the Moonbird. Caught by Penguin, Robin calls for Green Lantern and fellow bird-themed hero Hakwman to assist him in stopping Penguin. Toy-made characters: Robin, Green Lantern, Hawkman, The Penguin.
 Lex Luthor minicomic: Luthor kidnaps the President of the USA. Toy-made characters: Wonder Woman, Lex Luthor (Pre-Crisis), Superman, Aquaman
Green Lantern minicomic: The Joker is kidnapping a "Royal Flush" of hostages. Green Lantern discovers Robin has beaten him to locating the Joker's HQ. Together they defeat him and free the hostages. Toy-made characters: Green Lantern, Robin, The Joker
Hawkman minicomic: Hawkman tries to stop some birds controlled by Lex Luthor from stealing the Midway City museum. Flash and Green Lantern help Hawkman and discover the birds are robots. Toy-made characters: Hawkman, Lex Luthor (Pre-Crisis), Green Lantern, The Flash

Series 2
 Steppenwolf minicomic
 Martian Manhunter minicomic: Martian Manhunter stops Desaad's attack on the U.N. Toy-made characters: Martian Manhunter, Wonder Woman, Desaad, Firestorm
 Doctor Fate minicomic: Dr. Fate is forced to fight Superman and the Martian Manhunter who have fallen under the control of Darkseid, who sends them to collect Dr. Fate's artifacts. Toy-made characters: Doctor Fate, Superman, Martian Manhunter, Darkseid.
 Firestorm minicomic: Firestorm stops Mantis (with Superman's powers) from turning New York into another Apokolips. Toy-made characters: Firestorm, Green Arrow, Mantis and Superman.
 Mantis minicomic
 Green Arrow minicomic: Kalibak tries to steal a Martian jewel from the Star City Museum. Toy-made characters: Green Arrow, Martian Manhunter, The Flash, Kalibak
 Darkseid minicomic: Batman and Firestorm stop Darkseid from kidnapping Red Tornado. Toy-made characters: Batman, Firestorm, Red Tornado, Darkseid, Parademons
 Kalibak minicomic: Darkseid sends Kalibak to attack Dr. Fate, who summons Superman and Red Tornado to help. Toy-made characters: Darkseid, Doctor Fate, Kalibak, Red Tornado
 Desaad minicomic
 Parademon minicomic
 Red Tornado minicomic

Series 3
Estrela exclusive
 Shazam! minicomic: Captain Marvel faces the Sivana Family. Toy-made character: Shazam!
 Cyborg minicomic: Cyborg and the Teen Titans battle Brainiac. Toy-made characters: Cyborg, Brainiac, Robin.
 Plastic Man (Homem Borracha) minicomic: Plastic Man, Woozy Winks, and Chief Branner must stop Cheeseface and Edam O'Grottin (reprint of "The Milk of Human Cruelty" from Adventure Comics #476). Toy-made character: Plastic Man.

DC Comics action figure lines
Lists of comics based on toys
DC Comics-related lists